Iraq area codes can be 1 or 2 digits (not counting the trunk prefix 0) and the subscriber numbers are usually 6 digits. In Baghdad and some other governorates, they are 7 digits. The mobile numbers have 10 digits, beginning with the 3-digit code of each operator followed by 7 digits.

Dialing procedure
A call from outside Iraq would have the following dialing format when calling a:
Landline telephone:

Mobile telephone:

List of Area Codes in the Iraq

List of Mobile Phones Codes in Iraq

There are only 3 mobile phone providers. 

0790 Zain
0780-0785 Zain
0770-0775 AsiaCell
0760 Unknown
0750-0751 KoreK

List of Landline Phones Codes in Iraq

0662

References

ITU allocations list

Iraq
Telecommunications in Iraq
Mobile phone companies of Iraq
Iraq communications-related lists